Kelly Roberto Rafique Frederick (born October 7, 1978) is an Antigua and Barbudan former football player.

Career statistics

Club

Notes

International

International goals
Scores and results list Antigua and Barbuda's goal tally first.

References

1978 births
Living people
University of Nevada, Las Vegas alumni
Antigua and Barbuda footballers
Antigua and Barbuda expatriate footballers
Antigua and Barbuda international footballers
Association football forwards
C.F. União de Coimbra players
Expatriate footballers in Portugal
Expatriate soccer players in the United States